Esko Marttinen (born 15 January 1938) is a Finnish biathlete. He competed in the 20 km individual event at the 1964 Winter Olympics.

References

External links
 

1938 births
Living people
Finnish male biathletes
Olympic biathletes of Finland
Biathletes at the 1964 Winter Olympics
People from Kajaani
Sportspeople from Kainuu